Brook Silva-Braga (born March 27, 1979)<ref name="Back cover">Back cover of "A Map for Saturday DVD.</ref> is an American documentary film producer. He shared a Primetime Emmy Award for his production of Inside the NFL. He is best known from his documentary, A Map for Saturday, in which he produced, directed, and starred. This award-winning film is about his adventures as a backpacker for 11 months in 2005, in which he stayed in various hostels, and was released in 2007. His second film, One Day in Africa, was released in 2009. In 2011 his third film was released, The China Question. He is currently an on-air reporter for The Washington Post and freelances for CBS Newspath.

Early career
Silva-Braga was born and raised in Portsmouth, Rhode Island, and was a producer for HBO's Inside the NFL, for which he shared an Emmy Award.

A Map for Saturday
Making of the film
Silva-Braga quit his job with HBO "and he threw it all away" to travel around the globe for almost a year in 2005, with a video camera and equipment to record his adventures. It all started when HBO sent him to Asia for work on another story, and he discovered an underground network of backpackers, which enchanted him.

When he quit his job with HBO, his supervisor told him that, in the future, he'd only send married producers overseas. After he finished the film, he said that it had changed his outlook on life:
 and

Synopsis
The film is billed as "around the world in 90 minutes." Its title describes the feeling that, "On a trip around the world, every day feels like Saturday." When "everyday is Saturday, each new person an instant best friend," you need a guide to how to deal with "always saying goodbye, and loss of connection(s)." Silva-Braga stays in hostels around the world, showing us the "hot spots" of backpacking adventure—Australia, Southeast Asia, India, and London—and out-of-the-way places like Brazil, Nepal, and Thailand. He was forced to pack only five pounds of clothes, because of his 30 pounds of video equipment, and stay in many hostels to save money. He interviews various hostellers and fellow travellers along the way as he investigates how and why people take long-term, budget travel.

Premiere
The documentary premiered at the 2007 Cleveland International Film Festival, where it was screened four times.Benson, Melinda J. Filmstrip Tease, found at Northern Ohio Live web site.  Retrieved November 12, 2007. This film fest is a competitive one, drawing 43,000 attendees, 950 submissions, but only 180 films screened in 250 showings; this film was screened 4 times rather than the average 1.38 times of the typical film at the festival. The Cleveland Film Society, organizers of the film festival, created a live podcast during a panel interview with him. The local affiliate of ABC interviewed him while he was in town for the film festival.

ScreeningsA Map for Saturday was screened in Paris, France, shortly after the camera Silva-Braga used to film it was stolen.

The Hostelling International USA (HI-USA) is also screening the film at selected universities, colleges, and public libraries through its hostel councils.Albany Public Library official web page .  Retrieved February 22, 2008.A Map for Saturday was screened on the MTV network's "True Life" series, episode 58.

Critical reception
The film has garnered mostly excellent reviews. Sean Keener, CEO of BootsnAll Travel Network, wrote that it was "well done" and praised the filmmaker as "a good story teller."

The indieWIRE web site reviewed the premiere in Cleveland, stating that "director Brook Silva-Braga, despite having incredibly honorable intentions with his backpacking documentary, A Map For Saturday, misses an opportunity to provide insight about a group of people..."

Recent programs
Silva-Braga posted a series of blogs at Gadling.com, which is affiliated with AOL, as well as posting at TheInterviewPoint''.

On November 10, 2007, Silva-Braga was the keynote speaker at the national conference of Hostelling International USA in Washington, D.C.; HI-USA sponsored an essay-writing contest called "The Big Trip" to celebrate this event.

In January 2009, he completed his next documentary, "One Day in Africa".

References

External links
 
 
 A Map for Saturday
 One Day in Africa
 The China Question

1979 births
American cinematographers
American film directors
Living people
Youth hostelling
Backpacking
Adventure travel